Didier Gigon (born 10 March 1968) is a Swiss former footballer who played as a midfielder during the 1980s, 1990s and early 2000s.

Football career
Born in Biel/Bienne, Gigon started playing professionally with his local side FC Biel-Bienne in 1986 before moving to Neuchâtel Xamax in 1988. In 1991, he signed for Lausanne-Sport then moved on in 1993.

During the winter break of the 1993–94 Nationalliga A/B season, Gigon joined FC Basel under head-coach Claude Andrey. At that time Basel played in the Nationalliga B, the second tier of Swiss football. Gigon made his debut for his new club in the Swiss Cup home game in the St. Jakob Stadium on 12 February 1994 as Basel won 1–0 against Neuchâtel Xamax. He played his domestic league debut for the club in the away game in the Espenmoos on 27 February as Basel played a goalless draw with St. Gallen. His teammates in Basel's 1993–94 season were the likes of Swiss international goalkeeper Stefan Huber, defenders Massimo Ceccaroni, Marco Walker and Samir Tabakovic, the midfielders Mario Cantaluppi, Martin Jeitziner, Admir Smajić and Ørjan Berg and the Swiss international strikers Dario Zuffi and Philippe Hertig. Together they won the promotion/relegation group and became Nationalliga B champions and thus won promotion to the top flight of Swiss football. This after six seasons in the second tier.

After their promotion, Gigon stayed with Basel for another season. He scored his first league goal for the club in the home game on 31 May 1995. It was the first goal of the match, but it did not save the team from a 1–2 defeat against Neuchâtel Xamax.
During his one and a half years with the club Gigon played a total of 58 games for Basel scoring a total of five goals. 35 of these games were in the domestic league, five in the Swiss Cup, one in the UEFA Intertoto Cup and 17 were friendly games. He scored one goal in the domestic league, one in the cup and the other three were scored during the test games.

Gigon then returned to Neuchâtel Xamax where he played for three seasons. During the 1998–99 season he played for Sing Tao of Hong Kong and Portugal's F.C. Alverca and returned to Switzerland late in the season to play for Neuchâtel Xamax for a third time. Étoile Carouge signed him in 2000, and he retired in the summer of 2001.

He earned one cap for the Swiss national team on 3 April 1990 in the Stadion Allmend, Luzern, as Switzerland won 2–1 against Romania.

Honours
Neuchâtel Xamax
Swiss Super Cup: 1988, 1990

References

Sources
 Die ersten 125 Jahre. Publisher: Josef Zindel im Friedrich Reinhardt Verlag, Basel. 
 Verein "Basler Fussballarchiv" Homepage

External links
 

1968 births
Living people
People from Biel/Bienne
Association football midfielders
Swiss men's footballers
Swiss expatriate footballers
Switzerland international footballers
FC Biel-Bienne players
Neuchâtel Xamax FCS players
FC Lausanne-Sport players
F.C. Alverca players
FC Basel players
Étoile Carouge FC players
Swiss Super League players
Swiss Challenge League players
Expatriate footballers in Hong Kong
Sing Tao SC players
Sportspeople from the canton of Bern